The Mammal Research Institute of the Polish Academy of Sciences (MRI) is a research institution located in the heart of Europe’s best preserved lowland forest, Białowieża Primeval Forest in Poland. The mission of the Institute is to acquire, advance, and disseminate knowledge of mammalian biology. The Institute pursues its mission by conducting research on all aspects of mammalian biology, publishing in renowned scientific journals, developing international scientific co-operation, providing academic training.

The Mammal Research Institute was founded in 1952 and is an independent research institution of the Biology Department of the Polish Academy of Sciences. The Institute conducts research in morphology, taxonomy, systematics, evolution, population ecology, genetics, physiology, ethology, and ecology of mammals. From 1952-2006, researchers from the Institute published 23 books and over 1400 scientific papers. The list of international journals, where the research papers were published, exceeds 60 titles and includes the world’s leading biological, zoological, ecological, physiological and nature conservation journals. Since 2003 the Institute has attained status as a European Union Centre of Excellence and in 2006 was assessed as one of the Poland’s 5 best scientific institutions in the field of biology.

References

External links 
 MRI's home page

Institutes of the Polish Academy of Sciences
1952 establishments in Poland
Biology organizations